The 2013–14 Northern Kentucky Norse men's basketball team represented Northern Kentucky University during the 2013–14 NCAA Division I men's basketball season. The Norse, led by 10th year head coach Dave Bezold, played their home games at The Bank of Kentucky Center and were members of the Atlantic Sun Conference. They finished the season 9–21, 5–13 in A-Sun play to finish in a tie for eighth place. Due to their transition to Division I, the Norse will not be eligible to participate in post season play until 2017, including the Atlantic Sun Tournament.

Roster

Schedule and results
Source:

|-
!colspan=9 style=| Non-conference regular season

|-
!colspan=9 style=| Atlantic Sun regular season

References

Northern Kentucky Norse men's basketball seasons
Northern Kentucky